Eleodoro Ergasto Marenco (July 13, 1914 – June 17, 1996) was an Argentine artist, best known for his paintings on Argentine gauchos, horses, and horsemen. He illustrated many books, including notable editions of many important books from classical gaucho literature. He was appointed as costume advisor in the film Way of a Gaucho. A public square in Buenos Aires bears his name.

References 

1914 births
1996 deaths
20th-century Argentine painters
Argentine male painters
Artists from Buenos Aires
20th-century Argentine male artists